CHMI-DT (channel 13) is a television station licensed to Portage la Prairie, Manitoba, Canada, broadcasting the Citytv network to the Winnipeg area. Owned and operated by Rogers Sports & Media, the station has studios at 8 Forks Market Road (near Fort Gibraltar Trail and Waterfront Drive) in downtown Winnipeg, and its transmitter is located adjacent to Bohn Road (near Provincial Road 245) in Cartier.

History

In August 1980, Western Manitoba Broadcasters Ltd., owner of Brandon-based CKX-TV, met with community and business leaders to reveal their plan to start a new Portage la Prairie-based television station, with transmitter in Elie, Manitoba. The new station would employ about 20 people. There was no mention of what network it would connect to, but Craig hoped for ease of regulations that would allow him to pull in a network from the U.S. via satellite for programming. Originally some of the television programming would come from CBC Television, as like CKX, but after the CBC said they would not allow another competitive CBC broadcaster in the region because it would duplicate and cannibalize ad revenue of CBWT, Western Manitoba Broadcasters withdrew this part of the application.

An application was made in 1981 for a 287,000-watt station transmitting on VHF channel 13. Their application for a television license was denied by the Canadian Radio-television and Telecommunications Commission (CRTC) in 1981 due to "vague" programming promises.

When CKND-TV applied to the CRTC for extension of their signal into the Westman area via a transmitter in Minnedosa, CKX-TV filed an intervention opposing it, saying it would harm CKX's ad revenue. The regulatory body decided in CKX's favour. Despite this, CKND-TV-2 Minnedosa was granted a license and began broadcasting at 6 p.m. September 1, 1982.

Western Manitoba Broadcasters Ltd. applied to the CRTC again in 1985, this time promising to create a larger news department, with news bureaus in Winnipeg, Portage, Brandon and Dauphin. They intended on using call letters CPLP-TV, but later decided on CHMI-TV. The station would be seen on VHF channel 13, the last available clear channel in the region. Future licensed television stations would have to broadcast on UHF frequencies. The licensing hearing was held on December 3, 1985 in Winnipeg.

The station was licensed by the CRTC on May 8, 1986 and owned by Craig Media with a condition of licence that the station would not solicit advertising from businesses located in Winnipeg. This was to protect existing Winnipeg television stations. The station went on the air on October 17, 1986 where it was originally branded as the Manitoba Television Network or MTN. Although it has always been a Winnipeg station for all intents and purposes, for its first decade it was not allowed to sell advertising in Winnipeg.

Mark Evans was initially MTN's news director, before being replaced a year later by Al Thorgeirson.

MTN was well known for its Prairie Pulse News (later retitled MTN Pulse News, and then MTN News), MTN Kids Club, and Prime Ticket Movies, the last of which would carry over to the A-Channel system. The station's initial slogan was "Very independent, very Manitoba!"

In the fall of 1999, Craig Media moved the station's production facilities to the refurbished former Canadian National Railway Power House at The Forks in Winnipeg and rebranded the station as A-Channel, joining CKEM-TV in Edmonton and CKAL-TV in Calgary – effectively uniting Craig's non-CBC affiliates under the A-Channel banner. Technical operations for the station remained in Portage la Prairie.

At a CRTC hearing in Saskatoon in November 1999, Craig Broadcast Systems applied to take over the IMTV transmitter located in Dauphin on VHF channel 6. The signal would extend CHMI's reach into the Parkland region with a 44,000 watt signal. The former IMTV transmitter began broadcasting A-Channel in 2000.

In 2004, Craig Media announced a deal to sell its broadcasting assets to CHUM Limited. The sale was approved by the CRTC on November 19, 2004, and became official on December 1. On February 3, 2005, CHUM announced that the A-Channel stations, including CHMI, would be relaunched as Citytv by that fall; the changes took effect on August 2.

On July 12, 2006, CTVglobemedia announced its takeover of CHUM Limited, pending regulatory approval. CTV originally intended to retain CHMI and the other four Citytv stations, while divesting the A-Channel stations. As of January 2007, technical operations for the station have been moved to fellow Citytv station CKAL-TV in Calgary.

On June 8, 2007, the CRTC approved the CTV takeover of CHUM, but made the deal conditional on CTV divesting itself of Citytv (including CHMI) rather than A-Channel. The CRTC was not willing to allow CTV-Citytv twinsticks. On June 11, Rogers Communications announced that it would buy the Citytv stations for $375 million. The transaction was approved by the CRTC on September 28, and Rogers took control effective October 31.

Between October 2012 and 2018, the station began branding itself on promos and on-screen logos as "City", removing the "tv" portion from its identification. Since 2018, they have reverted to the original "Citytv" branding.

News operation

When 13MTN began broadcasting in 1986, two local newscasts were presented, one at 5:30 to 6:30 p.m., the other newscast from 10 to 11 p.m. Both programs were called Prairie Pulse Tonight. The first two news anchors were Michael Gligor and Barbara Higgins. Ron Thompson presented the weather forecast from Brandon's CKX studio via a live coaxial cable video link to the Portage studio leased from MTS. Ted Deller replaced Gligor in 1987–88. Diana Ottasen replaced Barbara Higgins. Sports anchor was Keith McMahon.

CHMI-DT currently broadcasts 14 hours of local news, which consists of hour-long broadcasts daily at 6 and 11 p.m. since September 4, 2017. CityNews programs previously aired until July 12, 2006, when it was announced that CTVglobemedia would acquire then-owner CHUM Limited. CHMI also aired a local version of Breakfast Television until 2015, when it was discontinued and replaced with a television simulcast of sister radio station CITI-FM's morning show Wheeler in the Morning. Former BT hosts Drew Kozub and Jenna Khan remained as contributors, hosting television-exclusive news and entertainment segments.

Technical information

Subchannel

Analogue-to-digital conversion
On August 31, 2011, when Canadian television stations in CRTC-designated mandatory markets transitioned from analogue to digital broadcasts, CHMI-TV flash cut its digital signal into operation on VHF channel 13.

References

External links

HMI-DT
Portage la Prairie
Television channels and stations established in 1986
HMI-DT
1986 establishments in Manitoba